Acanthodactylus ahmaddisii, also known commonly as the Jordanian fringe-fingered lizard, is a species of lizard in the family Lacertidae.

Geographic range
A. ahmaddisii is endemic to Jordan.

Etymology
The specific name, ahmaddisii, is in honor of Jordanian biologist Ahmad M. Disi.

Habitat
The natural habitats of A. ahmaddisii are subtropical or tropical dry shrubland.

Conservation status
The Jordanian fringe-fingered lizard is threatened by habitat loss.

Taxonomy
A. ahmaddisii was first described in 2004 by Israeli herpetologist Yehudah L. Werner.

References

Further reading
Schlüter U (2009). "Fransenfingereidechsen (Acanthodactylus) in der Natur und im Terrarium. Teil 4. Die Acanthodactylus-pardalis-Gruppe". Reptilia, Münster 14 (76): 52–60. (in German).
Sindaco R, Jeremčenko VK (2008). The Reptiles of the Western Palearctic. 1. Annotated Checklist and Distributional Atlas of the Turtles, Crocodiles, Amphisbaenians and Lizards of Europe, North Africa, Middle East and Central Asia. (Monographs of the Societas Herpetologica Italica). Latina, Italy: Edizioni Belvedere. 580 pp. .

Acanthodactylus
Reptiles described in 2004
Endemic fauna of Jordan
Taxa named by Yehudah L. Werner
Taxonomy articles created by Polbot